Gerald Elliott (1907–1982) was a British screenwriter.

Filmography
 Lieutenant Daring R.N. (1935)
 Jubilee Window (1935)
 Cross Currents (1935)
 A Star Fell from Heaven (1936)
 Birds of a Feather (1936)
 Pay Box Adventure (1936)
 Strange Cargo (1936)
 Men of Yesterday (1936)
 Hearts of Humanity (1936)
 Cafe Mascot (1936)
 Two on a Doorstep (1936)
 Full Speed Ahead (1936)
 Double Exposures (1937)
 Museum Mystery (1937)
 Our Fighting Navy (1937)
 The Frog (1937)
 Twin Faces (1937)
 Holiday's End (1937)
 The Song of the Road (1937)
 The Fatal Hour (1937)
 Dial 999 (1938)
 Silver Top (1938)
 Return of the Frog (1938)
 No Parking (1938)
 Inspector Hornleigh (1938)
 Blondes for Danger (1938)
 Sword of Honour (1939)
 Sons of the Sea (1939)
 All at Sea (1940)
 The Great Mr. Handel (1942)

References

Bibliography
 Brian McFarlane. Lance Comfort. Manchester University Press, 1999.

External links

1907 births
1982 deaths
People from Lewisham
20th-century British screenwriters